Africitas is a putative African dialect of Latin. The term was first used by Erasmus as pejorative to characterize certain elements of African Latin works. In the 20th century, the concept of Africitas was discussed by scholars, who often analyzed African authors like the Church Father Augustine and the grammarian Marcus Cornelius Fronto in regard to this hypothetical dialect. After 1945, this scholarly conversation died off for many years. However, the discussion was revived in the early 21st century by the publishing of the book, Apuleius and Africa (2014), which examined the concept of Africitas anew, this time largely in regard to the prose writer Apuleius.<ref name=brynmawrreview>{{cite journal|last1=Hunink|first1=Vincent|title=Review of Benjamin Todd Lee, Ellen Finkelpearl, Luca Graverini (ed.), Apuleius and Africa|url=http://bmcr.brynmawr.edu/2015/2015-04-04.html|journal=Bryn Mawr Classical Review|accessdate=February 27, 2017|date=April 4, 2015}}</ref>

Those who argue in favor of an Africitas claim that the dialect is demarcated by "peculiarities of vocabulary, syntax, sentence-structure, and style". G. N. Olcott further argues that African Latin "was freest in word formation." After a lengthy consideration of the topic, J. N. Adams argues that "there was [a type of language that we call Africitas, but] that, given the remoteness of parts of Africa, there was probably a plurality of varieties of Latin rather than a single 'African Latin'." Catherine Conybeare of Bryn Mawr argues that singling out Africitas can be viewed as racist. In regards to this, Vincent Hunink of Radboud University Nijmegen notes that, while it is undeniable that regional variants of spoken Latin existed, "no similar scholarly debate discussion" about the vocabulary, syntax, sentence-structure, and style of "'Germanitas' or 'Brittanitas' has ever come up", suggesting that a fixation on the existence of a supposed Africitas'' is problematic.

See also
 African Romance languages derived from local North African Latin.

References

Dialects
Forms of Latin
Languages of Algeria
Languages of Tunisia
Languages extinct in the 1st millennium
Roman North Africa